Yuvvraaj is a 2008 Indian drama film directed and produced by Subhash Ghai. The film stars Anil Kapoor, Salman Khan, Zayed Khan, Katrina Kaif and Boman Irani. Yuvvraaj is a musical story of a fragmented family of three brothers who try to con each other to inherit their father's wealth. According to the director, the film is about the arrogance and overconfidence of contemporary youth. The film was released on 21 November 2008. Although the film received mixed reviews from critics and bombed at the box-office, its script was added to the library of the Academy of Motion Picture Arts and Sciences in 2009.

Plot
Deven Yuvvraaj "Dev" Singh (Salman Khan) is a struggling singer who Dr. P. K. Banton (Boman Irani), his girlfriend Anushka’s (Katrina Kaif) father, dislikes because he is not wealthy and is rather careless at times. He signs an agreement to become a billionaire in 40 days. To acquire this wealth, he has to go through an emotional roller coaster journey of joy and pain with his two estranged brothers, Gyanesh Kumar Yuvvraaj Singh (Anil Kapoor) and Danny Yuvvraaj Singh (Zayed Khan), who he meets after 12 years. On meeting them, he is shocked to see that his father has left everything to the mentally challenged Gyanesh. So both Danny and Deven make an agreement to scam their brother out of his money. Danny's attempt to blackmail Gyanesh to make him lie in front of some lawyers fails and he assaults Gyanesh. Deven intervenes and plays the good guy and helps Gyanesh and takes him to Austria in an attempt to win him. There Anushka and Gyanesh get on very well and she is amazed by his singing talent. She lets him into her orchestra which is due to perform in front of thousands of people. Deven gets jealous as Anushka and Gyanesh get on so well but soon learns to love his brother.

Danny, now penniless and thrown out of all the luxurious clubs, loses his girlfriend. He meets up with Deven and Gyanesh and they all become loving brothers again and forget about the money. Deven and Danny's maternal uncle and his family decide to poison Gyanesh to get his money. They show Gyanesh a recording of Deven and Danny plotting to scam Gyanesh out of his money which breaks his heart. They then switch his inhaler with one containing poison and leave. Gyanesh, shocked and breathless uses his inhaler and fights with his brothers who realize that he knows about their plot. Heartbroken Gyanesh performs on stage when Deven shows up and they do a duet with Deven singing about forgiveness. Onstage Gyanesh collapses and Deven takes him to hospital whilst Danny gets the police to arrest the family members who tried to poison Gyanesh. At the hospital, Deven is informed that the only doctor available is Dr. Banton who refuses to help. Dr. Banton accuses him of only wanting Gyanesh to survive for the money so he can marry his daughter but Deven breaks down and tells Dr. Banton that if he saves Gyanesh he will not marry Anushka saying he just wants to keep his family together. Dr. Banton is shocked by Deven's sense of responsibility and saves Gyanesh. He then allows Deven to marry Anushka now that he has become a changed man who cares about his family. The ending is a dance scene featuring the cast and crew of the film.

Cast
 Salman Khan as Deven Yuvvraaj "Dev" Singh, a slightly ambitious guy who believes life begins with himself and ends with his love Anushka. A quarrel with his father was reason enough for him to leave home and live as a struggling singer. Devoid of family values, he is forced to journey through the circle of love for the sake of money to complete his love story.
 Anil Kapoor as Gyanesh Kumar Yuvvraaj Singh, an autistic savant, who is completely removed from the idea of money; therefore, his enormous inheritance has no impact on him. By some stroke of destiny, he has a genius disorder. Since childhood, he was brilliant in all aspects of music. He enters Deven’s world of music and effortlessly becomes the superstar that Deven dreamt of being.
 Zayed Khan as Danny Yuvvraaj Singh is the real prince who lived life super-large. A passion for flying kept him floating on an air cushion filled with his father’s money. A playboy and a brat, he was sure that the inheritance would be his. Unable to deal with the loss of his playground (as casinos and clubs threw him out), he strikes at Gyanesh in an attempt to get back what he thinks was rightfully his.
 Katrina Kaif as Anushka "Anu" Banton, an angelic girl who is passionately in love with her 'cello and Deven. She is also a girl of very high values. Although she loves Deven, she refuses to marry him unless her father accepts him willingly.
 Boman Irani as Dr. Pravin Kant "PK" Banton, Anushka's father who dislikes her daughter's love interest Deven.
 Aanjjan Srivastav as Om Prakash 'Mama Ji' who has declared the trustee of all property transferred to an orphanage, a negative character, who keeps a subtle approach, but all in disguise.
 Sulabha Arya as D'Mello Aunty
 Aushima Sawhney as Nandita
 Amy Maghera as Shazia, Danny's girlfriend
 Bhupinder Singh as Daniel Mehta, Anushka's fiancee
 Aparna Kumar as Sukamna
 Chimnay Patwardhan as Bala
 Javed Sheikh as Yogendra Yuvvraaj Singh; Gyanesh, Deven, and Danny’s late father (cameo appearance)
 Mithun Chakraborty as Advocate Sikander Mirza, an attorney and a friend of Gyanesh, Deven, and Danny's father. He insists Deven on having a true brotherly relation with Gyanesh. He wants to see the three brothers live as a happily united family.

Filming
Although a part of the film supposedly plays in the Czech capital Prague, the corresponding outdoor shots were actually filmed in the Austrian mountain province Tyrol. Scenes filmed in the province's capital Innsbruck feature many of the city's sights, such as the imperial castle, St. James's Cathedral, the main street and the ski jumping arena.

Reception

Critical response
The film received mixed reviews from critics. Taran Adarsh from Bollywood Hungama gave the film 3 out of 5 saying "On the whole, Yuvvraaj is interesting in parts, with the penultimate 20/25 minutes taking the film to an all-time high". Martin D'Souza of Glamsham giving it 3 from 5 stars said " In short, there's nothing new, script wise, but the way it has been backed with music and choreography is what lifts this mundane script to another level. The execution is 'perfect'". Nikhat Kazmi from Times of India rated it 3 out of 5 while praising the music, cinematography and performances by Salman Khan, Anil Kapoor and Katrina Kaif. IndiaGlitz also gave it 3 out of 5 and said "As a whole, Yuvvraaj is splendiferous in all parts with exceptional performance by all and it's a perfect family entertainer".

The film also received a number of negative reviews. Nikhil Kumar from Apunkachoice gave it 2.5/5 and said "The biggest flaw of 'Yuvvraaj' is that its story belongs to a period when the audiences used to lap up anything tossed at them. Sure, 'Yuvvraaj' has terrific cinematography and a few soulful tunes by A.R Rahman, But the style of telling the tale is so outdated, that at many times in 'Yuvvraaj' you feel you are watching a rerun of 'Ram Lakhan' or Taal". Rajeev Masand of IBN Live gave the film 1 out of 5 stars saying "Yuvvraaj doesn't quite hit the right note because it's an archaic drama that feels too tired. Barring a handful of vintage Subhash Ghai moments that still work, the film sadly is far from his best work". Sonia Chopra of Sify gave the film 1.5/5.

Box office
Yuvraaj was released with around 1000 prints in India, but it opened to a good response. Box Office India declared it a major flop.

Soundtrack

The score, composed by A. R. Rahman was performed by the Chennai String Orchestra, and utilizes Western classical music and retro disco music. The orchestra also performs Beethoven's Fifth Symphony. The soundtrack album was released on 16 October 2008. Salman Khan himself promoted the music saying that it is the USP of Yuvvraaj. The song "Tu Meri Dost Hai" became a chartbuster.

Reception
The album received positive reviews. Gulzar said "music of Yuvvraaj is magnificent". Usha Lakra from Apunkachoice gave it 4.5/5 saying "In 'Yuvvraaj', A.R Rahman has come up with such an album that it's hard to match its excellence with any other contemporary album. And music lovers should be grateful to Subhash Ghai for conceiving such a theme where this high quality music can be used". Rediff.com gave it 4 out of 5 stars and said Rahman excels in Yuvvraaj.

References

External links
 
 

2008 films
Films directed by Subhash Ghai
Films scored by A. R. Rahman
2000s Hindi-language films
Films shot in Prague
Films shot in Austria
Films about autism